Robinsons Retail Holdings, Inc., trading as RRHI, is one of the largest multi-format retailers in the Philippines. 

Founded by Filipino industrialist John L. Gokongwei, Jr. in 1980, Robinsons Retail started as Robinsons Department Store in Robinsons Place Manila. It expanded into supermarkets in 1985, DIY in 1994, convenience stores and specialty stores in 2000, and drugstores in 2012. Robinsons Retail also launched a chain of community malls in 2015.

References

External links 
 Robinsons Retail corporate website

 
Companies listed on the Philippine Stock Exchange
Companies based in Pasig
Retail companies of the Philippines